Louis Étienne Arthur du Breuil, vicomte de La Guéronnière (1816 – 23 December 1875) was a French politician and aristocrat, the member of a notable Poitou family.

Biography
Although from early on connected with Legitimism, he became closely associated with the Republican Alphonse de Lamartine, to whose paper, Le Bien Public, he was a principal contributor. After Le Bien Public came to an end, he wrote for La Presse, and in 1850 edited Le Pays.

A character sketch of Louis-Napoléon Bonaparte in this journal caused differences with Lamartine, and La Guéronnière became more and more closely identified with the policy of the prince-president. Under the Second Empire, he was a member of the Conseil d'État (1853), senator (1861), ambassador to Belgium (1868), and to the Ottoman Empire (1870), and Grand Officer of the Légion d'honneur (1866). He died in Paris.

Besides his Études et portraits politiques contemporains (1856) his most important works are those on the foreign policy of the Empire: La France, Rome et Italie (1851), Le Pape et le Congrès (1859), L'Abandon de Rome (1862), De la politique intérieure et extérieure de la France (1862).

His elder brother, Alfred du Breuil Helion, comte de La Guéronnière (1810–1884), who remained faithful to the Legitimist party, was also a well-known writer and journalist. He was consistent in his opposition to the July Monarchy and the Empire, but in a series of books on the Franco-Prussian War of 1870–1871 showed a more favorable attitude to the Third French Republic.

References

1816 births
1875 deaths
People from Haute-Vienne
Viscounts of France
Bonapartists
Members of the 1st Corps législatif of the Second French Empire
French Senators of the Second Empire
Ambassadors of France to Belgium
Ambassadors of France to the Ottoman Empire
19th-century French diplomats
French political writers
French opinion journalists
19th-century French journalists
French male journalists
French male essayists
19th-century French male writers
19th-century French essayists
Grand Officiers of the Légion d'honneur